The , named the  until 1964, is a Shinto shrine located in Sapporo, Hokkaido, Japan. Sited in Maruyama Park, Chūō-ku, Sapporo, Hokkaido, the Hokkaido Shrine enshrines four kami including the soul of the Emperor Meiji. A number of early explorers of Hokkaidō such as Mamiya Rinzō are also enshrined.

History
In 1869, by an order of the Emperor Meiji, a ceremony to enshrine three kami (Shinto deities); Ōkunitama, Ōkuninushi, and Sukunahikona, was held in Tokyo. An interim building of the shrine for three kami was constructed in 1870 in Sapporo, although its location was different from the current point where the Hokkaidō Shrine stands. In 1871, the shrine was erected in its current place and named "Sapporo Shrine" (Sapporo Jinja), and on September 14 an inaugural ceremony was held. The soul of Emperor Meiji was also newly enshrined there in 1964. The building was destroyed by a fire in 1974, but was later restored in 1978.

Overview
The area of the Hokkaido Shrine is 180,000 m2, and is adjacent to Maruyama Park. During the season which cherry blossoms in the area bloom, the shrine is crowded with people enjoying Hanami. Many people also visit the shrine during Japanese New Year to go Hatsumōde.

From June 14 to 16 in every year, the Main festival of Hokkaido Shrine, also called "Sapporo Festival" (Sapporo Matsuri), is held, and the line of people bearing Mikoshi parades down the street which leads to the shrine. It also manages Scouting activities.

See also
 List of Shinto shrines
 Twenty-Two Shrines
 Modern system of ranked Shinto Shrines

Notes

References

 Ponsonby-Fane, Richard Arthur Brabazon. (1962).  Studies in Shinto and Shrines.  Kyoto: Ponsonby Memorial Society. OCLC 399449
 ___. (1963).  The Viciissitudes of Shinto.  Kyoto: Ponsonby Memorial Society.  OCLC 186605327

External links
Hokkaido Jingu (Hokkaido Shrine) Web Site 
Hokkaido Jingu 

Kanpei-taisha

Jingū
Religious buildings and structures completed in 1871
Religious buildings and structures completed in 1978
Chūō-ku, Sapporo
Shinto shrines in Hokkaido
1869 establishments in Japan
Religious organizations established in 1869
Buildings and structures in Sapporo
Tourist attractions in Sapporo
Beppyo shrines